Gilbert L. Voss (1918 – 23 January 1989) was an American conservationist and oceanographer. He was one of the main persons behind the establishment of John Pennekamp Coral Reef State Park in Florida and he spoke out successfully against several proposed real estate developments that might have threatened the ecology of the Florida Keys.

Early life and family
Born in Hypoluxo, Florida in 1918, Voss was the son of early South Florida pioneers Captain Frederick C. Voss and his wife Lillie Pierce Voss, who was inducted into the Florida Women's Hall of Fame in 2012/2013.  His father was a boat captain and steam engineer.  Voss grew up on the water, sailing and fishing.  He and his brothers, Frederick Jr. and Walter, were guides and captains in tuna and bill fishing tournaments throughout Florida and the Caribbean.  Voss' wife, Nancy A. Voss (1929–2020), was Research Professor Emeritus and Museum Director at the University of Miami's Rosenstiel School of Marine and Atmospheric Science. His son, Robert Voss, is Curator, Department of Mammalogy, Division of Vertebrate Zoology at the American Museum of Natural History.

Scientific career
He earned bachelor's and master's degrees from the University of Miami and a doctorate from George Washington University. He started at the University of Miami in 1951 and was at the university's Rosensteil School of Marine and Atmospheric Science when he retired in 1988. From 1962 to 1973 he was chairman of the biology division.  He had been a research fellow at Woods Hole Oceanographic Institute, editor of the Bulletin of Marine Science and editor of Studies in Tropical Oceanography.

Professor Voss published over 200 items, including 73 book reviews, 16 editorials, and 124 research papers on such diverse topics as cephalopods, fishes, crustaceans, botany, zoogeography, history of oceanography, anthropology, archaeology, fisheries, and marine and deep sea biology.  He authored or co-authored descriptions of two new families or subfamilies, 6 new genera and more than 65 new species or subspecies.

A teuthologist, Voss "served the leading role in American cephalopod research for nearly 40 years". Michael J. Sweeney and Clyde F. E. Roper wrote of Voss's contribution to the field:

So important is his influence on the resurgence of cephalopod systematic research, hardly a paper has been published in cephalopod systematics and zoogeography, and even other
aspects of cephalopod biology and fisheries, that doesn't cite at least one paper published by Voss. This has been the case for nearly 4 decades and it will continue to be so for many decades into the 21st Century.

Voss authored the books Seashore Life of Florida and the Caribbean and Coral Reefs of Florida. A species of swimming crab, Portunus vossi, is named after him.

References

Further reading
 [Anonymous] (January 25, 1989). Gilbert L. Voss, protector of reefs, dies. [Obituary] The Miami Herald, pp. 1B, 3B.
 [Anonymous] (January 28, 1989). A living legacy of biologist Gil Voss. [Editorial] The Miami Herald, p. 26A.
 [Anonymous] (1989). Gilbert L. Voss, Ph.D., 1918–1989. Sea Frontiers 35(2): 68.
 Aldrich, F.A. (1989). A tribute to Gilbert L. Voss. Journal of Cephalopod Biology 1(1): 84–85.
 Clarke, M.R. (1989). Professor Gilbert L. Voss (1918–1989). Cephalopod Newsletter 11: 21–22.
 Lu, C.C. (1989). Tribute. Professor Dr. Gilbert L. Voss (1918–1989). Australian Shell News 68: 8.
 Roper, C.F.E. (1989). Gilbert L. Voss, 1918–1989. Cephalopod International Advisory Council Newsletter 4(1): 5.
 Roper, C.F.E. (1989). Professor Gilbert L. Voss (1918–1989). Cephalopod Newsletter 11: 22–23.

External links
 Committee for Research and Exploration: What We Fund

American oceanographers
1918 births
1989 deaths
University of Miami alumni
George Washington University alumni
University of Miami faculty
American conservationists
Teuthologists
20th-century American zoologists